Sir Philip Rose, 1st Baronet (12 April 1816 – 17 April 1883) was the son of William Rose, an Assistant Surgeon in the British Indian Army and Charlotte Rose (born Baly).

He was admitted as a solicitor in 1836 at the age of 20 and for many years was a partner in the law firm of Baxter, Rose, Norton & Co., resigning his partnership in 1872 after a disagreement with his colleagues. The firm still practices today under the name Norton Rose.

At the age of 25, reputedly after one of the clerks at the law firm who was suffering from consumption was refused admittance to several hospitals, Rose was a prime mover in the setting up of a hospital, the Hospital for Consumption and Diseases of the Chest, for sufferers of tuberculosis without the financial means to pay for such treatment as was available at the time.  Rose was Honorary-Secretary of the hospital from its inception until his death.

In 1854 he was the first recognised agent for the Conservative Party and after the defeat of Lord Derby’s first administration was largely responsible for the restoration of its political fortunes. He was assisted by Markham Spofforth. He had to resign as agent in 1859 because of concerns about corruption. He was also a close friend of and adviser to Benjamin Disraeli. After his resignation from the law firm he devoted himself to public affairs including Treasurer of the County Courts of Derbyshire, Deputy-Lieutenant of Middlesex, and first Magistrate and then in 1878 High Sheriff of Buckinghamshire. He was created a Baronet in 1874 for his work as legal adviser to the Conservative Party.

In 1868 he founded the Foreign & Colonial Investment Trust as The Foreign & Colonial Government Trust, the world's first collective investment scheme.

For special services to the Ottoman Empire he was made a Knight Commander of the Turkish Order of the Medjidie.

He also served as a director of several public companies.

Family
On 2 Jan 1840, at St Clement's Church, Hasting, Sussex, he married Margaretta Ranking (1816 - 1889)

His descendants include the writers Ian Fleming and Peter Fleming.

References

The Seven Ages of The Brompton (A Saga of a Hospital) by P. J. Bishop, B. D. B. Lucas And B. G. B Lucas. Published by the Board of Governors, Royal Brompton National Heart and Lung Hospitals, 1991.

External links
Archival Material at 

1816 births
1883 deaths
Baronets in the Baronetage of the United Kingdom
English solicitors
Recipients of the Order of the Medjidie
Deputy Lieutenants of Middlesex
High Sheriffs of Buckinghamshire
19th-century English lawyers
Clan Rose